The Riverine Grazier  is an English language newspaper published in Hay, New South Wales from 1873.  The paper absorbed the Riverina Times, Hay Standard and Journal of Water Conservation in October 1902.

History
The first issue of The Riverine Grazier was on 29 October 1873.  The paper was published every Wednesday and could be subscribed to for £1 per year.  It contained agricultural information, news and advertisements for goods and services in the area.

Its founder was John Andrew; it was purchased in 1888 by James Ashton M.L.C. (previously a compositor with the Hay Standard then a clerk with Cramsie, Bowden and Co.) and John Johnston O.B.E. (ca.1864 – 29 October 1939) who was previously an accountant with Cobb and Co. then branch manager for the Equitable Assurance Company, of New Zealand.

In 1902 it moved to new premises opposite Tattersall's Hotel, Hay, and shortly afterwards purchased and incorporated the Riverina Times (previously the Hay Standard).

Editors
The following individuals have held the position of editor:

Digitisation
The various versions of the paper have been digitised as part of the Australian Newspapers Digitisation Program project hosted by the National Library of Australia.

See also
 List of newspapers in New South Wales
 List of newspapers in Australia

References

External links

Bibliography
 Holden, W Sprague 1961, Australia goes to press, Melbourne University Press, Melbourne.
 Mayer, Henry 1964, The press in Australia, Lansdowne Press, Melbourne.
 Walker, R B 1976, The newspaper press in New South Wales 1803-1920, Sydney University Press, Sydney.

Newspapers published in New South Wales
Newspapers on Trove